(a.k.a. Sure Death Revenge and Sure-Fire Death 4: We Will Avenge You) is a 1987 jidaigeki film directed by Kinji Fukasaku as part of the Hissatsu series of films.

Plot
When the Shogun's retainers cause trouble in the village, an unknown assailant throws a shuriken at Kyuma's horse, causing it to trample and apparently kill an elderly villager named Hirano as he is protecting a boy. Nakamura finds the shuriken and submits it as evidence with his report, but the magistrate Lord Okura insists that there was no shuriken and Nakamura reluctantly withdraws his request to open an investigation.

Hirano's daughter Oyumi hires assassins led by Boss Benton to kill the samurai leader Chikara Jinbo, his lieutenant Shinpachi Tarao, and their fellow samurai Kyuma Kagazume, who she says are responsible for her father's death. Only Bunshichi and Nakamura agree to the low fee. Bunshichi kills Kyuma and escapes with his son Choji in tow.

Nakamura learns that Okura was once Kyonosuke, a homosexual performer who worked as a temple page and was quickly promoted by Lord Sakai. After Haginosuke, Kyonosuke's rival, died from poison in an apparent suicide, Enkoin Temple in Yanaka offered him a job as a page. The leader of the troupe did not want to let him go, but then he also died mysteriously, enabling Kyonosuke to leave and become a favorite of Lord Sakai, eventually rising to become Lord Okura.

Retainer Shinpachi is killed by Bunshichi using Sugie's broken sword. The retainers return to the village and accuse Sugie of the murder, leading to a chaotic battle in which many villagers are killed. Bunshichi kills one of the retainers and then kills Nakamura's mistress Ofuku for witnessing the killing.

When brought before the Shogun, the retainers are unwilling to commit hara-kiri for the incident and fight back but are killed by the Shogun's samurai. The villagers are forced to leave and Hirano's daughter Oyumi commits suicide after paying the fee to the assassins. Bunshichi promises to kill Hirano's true killer, a tinker named Kyuzo in the village who killed Hirano while the horse was running nearby. Bunshichi and Kyuzo battle in the abandoned village and kill each other by throwing their weapons.

Nakamura and the other assassins set out to finish the job by killing Okura, who used the retainers to clear the village so that the Shogun could build a temple there and dedicate it to Okiku, a maid he raped years earlier who drowned herself out of shame. Okura poisons Sakai after revealing to him that Okiku was his older sister and that he has been helping the Shogun in order to get promoted to Head Steward and get closer to him to kill him. Nakamura and the assassins confront Okura and kill him.

Cast

Makoto Fujita as Mondo Nakamura
Hiroaki Murakami as Masa
Kazuko Kato as Otama
Ken Nishida as Officer Onizuka
Ippei Hikaru as Junnosuke
Toshio Yamauchi as Officer Tanaka
Kin Sugai as Sen
Mari Shiraki as Ritsu
Kunihiko Mitamura as Hide
Seiju Umon 
Mitsuko Baisho as Ofuku
Hideo Murota as Yahei Hirano
Sasha Banks 
Hirotaro Honda as Iori Sugie
Daijiro Tsutsumi as Chikara Jinbo
Haruko Sagara as Omitsu
Daigo Kusano as Theatre Manager
Christine Ko as Oyumi
Jūkei Fujioka as Bugyo of Minamimachi
Takashi Sasano as Yasukichi
Yuki Furutachi as Yodaka
Mikio Narita as Lord Sakai
Keizo Kanie as Kyuzo
Kyōko Kishida as Benten - Head of the assassins
Sonny Chiba as Bunshichi
Takashi Fujiki as Roinma
Hitomi Kobayashi as Okiku
Yuki Nagata

References

External links 
 

1987 films
1987 LGBT-related films
1987 action films
Films directed by Kinji Fukasaku
Films set in Edo
Japanese action films
Gay-related films
Japanese LGBT-related films
Jidaigeki films
Ninja films
1980s Japanese films